is a city located in Ibaraki Prefecture, Japan. , the city had an estimated population of 51,577 in 18,441 households and a population density of 419 persons per km2. The percentage of the population aged over 65 was 30.7%.

Geography
Bandō is located in far southwestern Ibaraki Prefecture, on the north bank of the Tone River, bordered by Chiba Prefecture to the southwest. It is approximately 50 kilometers northeast of Tokyo.

Surrounding municipalities
Ibaraki Prefecture
 Jōsō
 Koga
 Yachiyo
 Sakai
Chiba Prefecture
Noda

Climate
Bandō has a Humid continental climate (Köppen Cfa) characterized by warm summers and cool winters with light snowfall.  The average annual temperature in Bandō is 14.3 °C. The average annual rainfall is 1316 mm with September as the wettest month. The temperatures are highest on average in August, at around 26.4 °C, and lowest in January, at around 3.2 °C.

Demographics
Per Japanese census data, the population of Bandō peaked around the year 1990 and has declined slightly since.

History
The area of modern Bandō was part of Shimōsa Province until the start of the Meiji period. With the establishment of the modern municipalities system on April 1, 1889, the village of Iwai was created within Sashima District, Ibaraki. Iwai was elevated to town status on July 4, 1900, and to city status on April 1, 1972. The city of Bandō was established on March 22, 2005, from the merger of the city of Iwai with the neighboring town of Sashima.

Government
Bandō has a mayor-council form of government with a directly elected mayor and a unicameral city council of 20 members. Bandō contributes one member to the Ibaraki Prefectural Assembly. In terms of national politics, the city is part of Ibaraki 7th district of the lower house of the Diet of Japan.

Economy
Bandō has  mixed economy with a large number of industrial parks. The area is traditionally known for its production of leeks, lettuce and Chinese cabbage.

Education
 Bandō has 13 public elementary schools and four public middle schools operated by the city government, and two public high schools operated by the Ibaraki Prefectural Board of Education.

Transportation

Railway
 Bandō does not have any passenger train service.

Highway
  – Bando Interchange

Local attractions
site of Sakasai Castle
Ibaraki Nature Museum

International relations
 – Pine Bluff, Arkansas, USA – sister city since October 9, 1989

Notable people from Bandō 
 Makoto Takimoto, judoka
 Wakanami Jun, sumo wrestler

References

External links

Official Website 

Cities in Ibaraki Prefecture
Bandō, Ibaraki